Gavino Gulia (1835–1889) was a Maltese botanist and author of books on flora of that island.

References

 Obituary in: 

1835 births
1889 deaths
Maltese scientists
19th-century botanists